KHOJ is a radio station broadcasting out of St. Charles, Missouri with a Catholic format. It broadcasts on AM frequency 1460 kHz and is part of the Covenant Network.

KHOJ's studios are located on Hampton Avenue in St. Louis, while its transmitter is located north of St. Charles.

History
KIRL went on the air in 1968, the successor to KADY, which had previously operated on the frequency from 1958 to 1965 (and built the transmitter site used by KHOJ today). It was owned by Contemporary Media, Inc. In 1979, Contemporary Media sold KIRL to the Bronco Broadcasting Company. Bronco relaunched KIRL as a gospel music station for the African American community. Zella Jackson Price and other pioneering announcers were on its air staff.

In 2005, Bronco sold KIRL to the Covenant Network for $730,000. The sale marked the end of KIRL's gospel programming as of April 30 and scattered many of the religious programs it carried. Covenant immediately relaunched the station as KHOJ with its programming.

References

External links

 The Covenant Network
 WRYT / KHOJ Programming Schedule
 
 
 
 
 FCC History Cards for KHOJ

HOJ (AM)
Catholic radio stations
Radio stations established in 1968
1968 establishments in Missouri